Gong are a Franco/British rock band founded by Australian vocalist/guitarist Daevid Allen and English vocalist Gilli Smyth in 1967. The bands first recording line-up featured Allen and Smyth alongside bassist Christian Tritsch, drummer Rachid Houari and saxophonist/flautist Didier Malherbe. The band current line-up from Allen's death from 13 March 2015 features lead guitarist Fabio Golfetti (in 2007 and since 2012), bassist Dave Sturt (since 2009) saxophonist/flautist Ian East (since 2010), vocalist/guitarist Kavus Torabi (since 2014) and drummer Cheb Nettles (since 2014).

History

1967–1976 
In September 1967, Australian singer and guitarist Daevid Allen, a member of the English psychedelic rock band Soft Machine, was denied re-entry to the United Kingdom for 3 years following a French tour because his visa had expired. He settled in Paris, where he and his partner, London-born Sorbonne professor Gilli Smyth, established the first incarnation of Gong (later referred to by Allen as "Protogong") along with Ziska Baum on vocals and Loren Standlee on flute. However, the nascent band came to an abrupt end during the May 1968 student revolution, when Allen and Smyth were forced to flee the country after a warrant was issued for their arrest. They headed for Deià in Majorca, where they had lived for a time in 1966.

In August 1969, film director Jérôme Laperrousaz, a close friend of the pair, invited them back to France to record a soundtrack for a motorcycle racing movie which he was planning. This came to nothing at the time, but they were subsequently approached by Jean Karakos of the newly-formed independent label BYG Actuel to record an album, and so set about forming a new electric Gong band in Paris, recruiting their first rhythm section of Christian Tritsch (bass) and Rachid Houari (drums and percussion) and re-connecting with a saxophonist called Didier Malherbe whom they had met in Deià. However, Tritsch was not ready in time for the sessions and so Allen played the bass guitar himself. The album, entitled Magick Brother, was completed in October.

Houari left the band in the spring of 1971 and was replaced by English drummer Pip Pyle, whom Allen had been introduced to by Robert Wyatt during the recording of his debut solo album, Banana Moon, by the end of the year Pyle had left the group, to be replaced by another English drummer, Laurie Allan. Gong went through increasing line-up disruption in 1972. Laurie Allan left in April to be replaced by Mac Poole, then Charles Hayward and then Rob Tait, before returning again late in the year. Gilli Smyth left for a time, returning to Deià to look after her and Daevid Allen's baby son, and was replaced by Diane Stewart, who was the partner of Tait and the ex-wife of Graham Bond. Christian Tritsch moved to guitar and was replaced on bass by former Magma member Francis Moze, while the band's sound was expanded with the addition of synthesizer player Tim Blake.

In October 1972 they were one of the first acts to sign to Richard Branson's fledgling Virgin Records label, and in late December traveled to Virgin's Manor Studio in Oxfordshire, England, to record their third album, Flying Teapot. Towards the end of their recording sessions they were joined by English guitarist Steve Hillage, whom they had met a few weeks earlier in France playing with Kevin Ayers. He arrived too late to contribute much to the album, but would soon become a key component in the Gong sound. 

Flying Teapot was released on 25 May 1973, the same day as Tubular Bells, and was the first instalment of the Radio Gnome Invisible trilogy, which expounded upon the (previously only hinted at) Gong mythology developed by Allen. The second part, Angel's Egg, followed in December, now featuring the 'classic' rhythm section of Mike Howlett on bass and Pierre Moerlen on drums. In early 1974 Moerlen left to work with the French contemporary ensemble Les Percussions de Strasbourg and Smyth left to give birth to her and Allen's second son. They were replaced once again by Rob Tait and Diane Stewart.

Moerlen, and later Smyth, returned in order to complete the trilogy with the album You, but by the time of its release, in October 1974, Moerlen was back with Les Percussions de Strasbourg and Smyth had settled permanently in Deià with her young sons. Prior to touring in support of You, Allen visited Smyth and the boys in Deià, while the rest of the band, including the departed Moerlen, recorded the basic tracks for Hillage's first solo album, Fish Rising. Moerlen was initially replaced in Gong by a succession of stand-ins (Chris Cutler, Laurie Allan and Bill Bruford) until former Nice and Refugee drummer Brian Davison took the job in early 1975. Smyth had already been replaced by Hillage's partner Miquette Giraudy.

Increasing tension and personality clashes led to Tim Blake being asked to leave in February 1975 during rehearsals for a tour. He was not replaced. Then, at a gig in Cheltenham on 10 April, the day before the release of Steve Hillage's Fish Rising album, Daevid Allen refused to go on stage, claiming that a "wall of force" was preventing him from doing so, and he left the band. The others decided to carry on without him.

In August, Pierre Moerlen was persuaded to return, replacing the unhappy and alcoholic Davison, and the band now also added Mireille Bauer on percussion, Jorge Pinchevsky on violin and Patrice Lemoine on synthesizer and, for the first time in Gong, keyboards. They toured the UK in November 1975, as documented on the 2005 release Live in Sherwood Forest '75, and worked on material for their next album, Shamal. Hillage, however, was increasingly uncomfortable without Allen, and with now being seen as the band's de facto leader. With a solo career beckoning, he and Giraudy decided to leave before Shamal was completed, participating in it only as guests. Howlett took over as lead male vocalist and Sandy Colley, Lemoine's partner and the band's cook, became his female counterpart.

The album was released in February 1976 and they toured in support until a crisis was precipitated in May when Pinchevsky was refused entry to the U.K. for carrying marijuana. Ex-King Crimson violinist David Cross was tried out as a possible replacement, but before any progress could be made with this new line-up, the band split into two camps: Howlett wanted to keep vocals, but Moerlen and Bauer wanted the music to be entirely instrumental, with Malherbe undecided. Virgin Records executive Simon Draper chose Moerlen's way and Howlett left, quickly followed by Lemoine and Colley.

1976–2007 
For contractual reasons, the Gong name remained in play for another two years, but the band was now effectively Pierre Moerlen's Gong, having little to do with the psychedelic space rock of Daevid Allen. Moerlen formed a new mallet percussion based line-up, adding his brother Benoit Moerlen, future Weather Report percussionist Mino Cinelu, journeyman guitarist Allan Holdsworth and Flying Teapot bassist Francis Moze to record the album Gazeuse! in late 1976. Malherbe, Holdsworth, Moze and Cinelu all left soon afterwards, but Moerlen kept a band going with American bassist Hansford Rowe until the late 1980s. To avoid confusion, it first became known as Gong-Expresso and then, from 1978, as Pierre Moerlen's Gong. One last album, Pentanine, was recorded in 2002 with Russian musicians before Moerlen died unexpectedly in May 2005, aged 53.

A Gong reunion event held in Paris in May 1977 brought together all of the current strands which had developed and re-asserted the primacy of the Daevid Allen-led band. It featured sets by Tim Blake, Lady June, Howlett's Strontium 90, Steve Hillage, 'Shamal Gong', Gong-Expresso, Daevid Allen and Euterpe, and was headlined by Trilogy Gong, the classic lineup of Allen, Smyth, Malherbe, Blake, Hillage, Giraudy, Howlett and Moerlen. Their performance was documented on the live album Gong est Mort, Vive Gong. Strontium 90 was Mike Howlett's short-lived band which was notable for having two bass players, and for introducing Police members Sting and Stewart Copeland to their future guitarist Andy Summers.

Daevid Allen continued to develop the Gong mythology in his solo albums and with two new bands: Planet Gong (1977), which comprised Allen and Smyth playing with the British festival band Here & Now, and New York Gong (1979), comprising Allen and the American musicians who would later become known as Material. At the same time, Gilli Smyth formed Mother Gong with English guitarist/producer Harry Williamson and Didier Malherbe, and played in Spain and England. Allen delighted in this proliferation of groups and considered his role at this time to be that of an instigator, traveling around the world leaving active Gong-related bands in his wake.

After spending most of the Eighties in his native Australia, Allen returned to the UK in 1988 with a new project, The Invisible Opera Company of Tibet, whose revolving cast included violinist Graham Clark and Gong saxophonist Didier Malherbe. This morphed into Gongmaison in 1989, which added Harry Williamson from Mother Gong and had a techno-influenced sound with electronic beats, as well as live percussion from Shyamal Maïtra. In 1990, the Gong name was revived for a one-off U.K. T.V. appearance with a line-up featuring Allen, Smyth and Malherbe, plus early 70s drummer Pip Pyle and three members of Here & Now (band): Stephen Lewry (lead guitar), Keith Bailey (bass) and Paul Noble (synth). In April 1992, Gongmaison became Gong permanently with the combined line-up of Allen, Malherbe, Bailey and Pyle, plus Graham Clark and Shyamal Maïtra from Gongmaison. Together they recorded the album Shapeshifter (subsequently dubbed Radio Gnome Invisible, Part 4) and toured extensively.

In 1994, Gong celebrated its 25th birthday with a show in London which featured the return of Gilli Smyth, bassist Mike Howlett and lead guitarist Stephen Lewry of Here & Now. This formed the basis of the band which toured worldwide from 1996 to 2001, with Pierre Moerlen replacing Pip Pyle on drums from 1997 through 1999. The album Zero to Infinity was released in 2000, by which time the line-up had changed again to Allen, Smyth, Malherbe and Howlett, plus new recruits  on sax/keys and Chris Taylor on drums. This line-up was unique in the band's history in having two sax/flute players.

2003 saw a radical new line-up including Acid Mothers Temple members Kawabata Makoto and Cotton Casino, plus University of Errors guitarist Josh Pollock. Allen and Smyth's son Orlando drummed on the 2004 studio album Acid Motherhood, but for the subsequent live dates the rhythm section was Ruins drummer Tatsuya Yoshida and Acid Mothers Temple bassist Tsuyama Atsushi. A live album recorded by this line-up in 2004 was released as Acid Mothers Gong Live Tokyo and they played a few more one-off shows in 2006 and 2007.

The European version of Gong had retired from regular touring in 2001, but there were subsequent one-off reunions, most notably at the "Gong Family Unconventions" (Uncons), the first of which was held in 2004 in the Glastonbury Assembly Rooms as a one-day event and featured many ex-members and Gong family bands including Here & Now, House of Thandoy, Thom the Poet, Invisible Opera Company, Andy Bole, Bubbledub and Joie Hinton. The 2005 Uncon was a 2-day affair featuring several Gong-related bands such as Here & Now, System 7, House of Thandoy and Kangaroo Moon. The next Uncon was a 3-day event held at the Melkweg in Amsterdam on 3–5 November 2006, with practically all Gong-related bands present: 'Classic' Gong (Allen, Smyth, Malherbe, Blake, Howlett, Travis, Taylor, plus the return of Steve Hillage and Miquette Giraudy), System 7, The Steve Hillage Band, Hadouk, Tim Blake and Jean-Philippe Rykiel, University of Errors, Here & Now, Mother Gong, Zorch, Eat Static, Sacred Geometry Band, Acid Mothers Gong and many others. These events have all been compèred by Thom the Poet (now "Thom Moon 10").

2007 onwards 
In November 2007, Daevid Allen held a series of concerts in Brazil with a new band which he called Gong Global Family. This consisted of Allen on vocals and guitar, Josh Pollock on guitar, Fabio Golfetti (of Violeta de Outono) on guitar, Gabriel Costa (also from Violeta de Outono) on bass, Marcelo Ringel on flute and tenor saxophone, and Fred Barley on drums. He also performed with his other band, University of Errors (Allen, Pollock, Barley and Michael Clare).

In June 2008, Gong played two concerts in London, at Queen Elizabeth Hall on the South Bank (opening Massive Attack's Meltdown festival) and at The Forum, with a line-up of Allen, Smyth, Hillage, Giraudy, Howlett, Taylor and Travis. This line-up then released a new album, 2032, in 2009 and toured in support, including the Glade stage at Glastonbury Festival. They played at The Big Chill festival in the UK on 9 August 2009 with Allen, Smyth, Hillage, Giraudy, Travis, Taylor and new bassist Dave Sturt, as well as the Beautiful Days festival in Devon and the Lounge On The Farm festival near Canterbury.

Gong played four UK live shows in September 2010 with Allen, Smyth, Hillage, Giraudy, Sturt, Taylor and new wind player Ian East.  Support for these shows was provided by Nik Turner's Space Ritual.Gong toured Europe in the fall of 2012 with the line-up of Allen, Smyth, Sturt and East, plus Orlando Allen (Acid Mothers Gong) on drums, and Fabio Golfetti (Gong Global Family) on guitar. It would be Gilli Smyth's final tour with the band. They played in Brazil in May 2013 and again in 2014, this time with the addition of Kavus Torabi on guitar.

The 2014 line-up released a new studio album entitled I See You on 10 November, with Gilli Smyth guesting. However, Daevid Allen had been diagnosed with a cancerous cyst in his neck and had to undergo radiation therapy followed by an extensive period of recuperation. The I See You tour went ahead without him, and the line-up of Sturt, East, Golfetti, Torabi and a "mystery drummer" (revealed to be Cheb Nettles) played five dates in France and two in the UK.

On 5 February 2015, Daevid Allen released a statement announcing that the cancer had returned to his neck and had also spread to his lungs, and that he was "not interested in endless surgical operations", leaving him with "approximately six months to live". Just over a month after the initial announcement, on 13 March 2015, Daevid's son Orlando announced through Facebook that Allen had died in Byron Bay, Australia, aged 77.

On 11 April 2015, it was revealed that Allen had written an email to the band prior to his death, expressing his wish that the five remaining members continue performing following his passing and suggesting that Kavus Torabi become the new frontman of the band.

Gilli Smyth died on 22 August 2016, aged 83. She had been admitted to hospital in Byron Bay with pneumonia a couple of days previously.

On 5 July 2016, it was announced that the band line-up consisting of Kavus Torabi, Fabio Golfetti, Dave Sturt, Ian East and Cheb Nettles had recorded a new album entitled Rejoice! I'm Dead!, featuring guest appearances from Steve Hillage on guitar, Didier Malherbe on duduk and Graham Clark on violin, with Daevid Allen's vocals appearing on two tracks. Rejoice! I'm Dead! was released on 16 September 2016 through Snapper Music. On May 2019, the lineup followed up with their fifteenth album The Universe Also Collapses. In 2019 the current line-up of Gong joined the Steve Hillage Band as backing musicians and as the opening act. Gong in their current form continue to tour till the present.

Members

Current members
{| class="wikitable" width="100%" border="1"
! width="75" |Image
! width="120" |Name
! width="130" |Years active
! width="110" |Instruments
!Release contributions
|-
|
|Fabio Golfetti 
|
|
|
|-
|
|Dave Sturt
| rowspan="2" |2009–present
|
| rowspan="3" |all releases from I See You (2014) to present
|-
|
|Ian East
|
|-
|
|Kavus Torabi
| rowspan="2" |2014–present
|
|-
|
|Cheb Nettles
|
|all releases from Rejoice! I'm Dead! (2016) to present
|}

Former members

Timeline

Line-ups

References 

 Gong at Calyx, The Canterbury Music Website, by Aymeric Leroy - includes detailed chronology

Gong